1st Rank Raju is an Indian Telugu comedy-drama film written and directed by Naresh Kumar HN and produced by Manjunath VK. The film is a remake of the director's own 2015 Kannada film of the same name. The music director Kiran Ravindranath. The release date is 21 June 2019. It stars Chetan Maddineni and Kaashish Vohra in lead roles.

Synopsis 
The screenplay explores the importance of academic qualification and the parental belief that only academic achievements result in a successful life.

Plot 
Shobhan Babu decides to raise his son Raju to become a topper. Throughout his childhood, Raju is indoctrinated with the belief that general knowledge is worthless before book knowledge. He becomes a topper throughout school and college but lacks common sense and social skills.

Nevertheless, a girl named Shruthi becomes interested in him and takes him out on dates. Shruthi confesses her feelings for Raju one month later, but the latter scorns her because he is obsessed with obtaining first rank.

During a campus placement, one of the interviewers, Mr. Parthasarathy, rejects Raju, highlighting the latter's neurotic personality.

Raju is dejected, and his father vows to transform him into a trendy guy. To that end, his parents prepare a list of activities he has to do before graduating. Consequently, Raju befriends delinquent students, and Shruthi once more loves him. However, he is conflicted about cheating all of them to get a job.

To complete the final activity, which is getting Shruthi to propose to Raju, his parents plan a fake birthday party. However, some delinquents, jealous of Raju, engineer an unfavorable situation which leads to conflicts. Afterward, they expose the schemes of Raju's parents, and Raju falls out of favor.

Disillusioned by the series of events, Raju realizes that friendship and love are not syllabus, but sentiments that should not be toyed with. He sheds his image and decides to travel alone while exploring the world around him. One day, while relaxing near a river, Raju witnesses a young boy attempting suicide. Raju rushes the boy to the hospital, but the latter dies en route. The boy's suicide note states that he was interested in cricket, but everyone around him pushed him to study against his will. Raju confronts the school principal and has an altercation with him, garring media attention. In the end, Raju states that education is not a business and that life's lessons are extremely important.

Raju returns and reconciles with his friends. He turns down Parthasarathy's job offer but thanks him for inspiring him. Many years later, Raju and Shruthi are married. He watches a man pointing at a company campus and telling his son to achieve the first rank so that he may earn a place there. Raju approaches the boy and tells him that while hard work may earn him a job, following his heart will earn him an entire business. The father tells Raju not to say such things, but Raju points out that he owns the company before him.

Cast 
 Chetan Maddineni as 1st Rank Raju
 Kaashish Vohra as Shruthi 
 Amit as Nandu
 Ramya Pasupuleti as Jessie 
 Prakash Raj as CEO Parthasarathy
 Rao Ramesh as School Principal
 Vennela Kishore as Bollywood Bobby
 Brahmanandam as Psychiatrist Manormani 
 Naresh as Karampudi Shobhan Babu, Raju's father
 Rajashree as Raju's mother
 Posani Krishna Murali as Principal, Visvesvaraya College of Engineering
 Priyadarshi as Chintu 
 Naveen Neni as Mahesh  
 Tanikella Bharani as Coordinator  
 Nagineedu as Educational Minister
 Gundu Sudarshan as Subba Rao
 Uppada Parvateesam
 Mahaboob Basha
 Fish Venkat as Goon

Soundtrack
The film's soundtrack was composed by Kiran Ravindranath and the lyrics by Vanamali.

Production 
Dolphin Entertainment is an Indian production company, which was established  by Manjunath V Kandkur in 2014. The Production house's first film was First Rank Raju. The film was released in 2015 and ran for 100 successful days.  Their second production is this remake of First Rank Raju in Telugu.

References

External links 
 

Indian comedy-drama films
Telugu remakes of Kannada films
2010s Telugu-language films
2019 films
2019 comedy-drama films